Water hyacinth has become a major invasive plant species in Lake Victoria and while it is native to the continent of South America, human activity has introduced the greenery to Lake Victoria, where it is claimed to have negatively affected local ecosystems.

History 
The exact time and place of introduction                                                                                                     has been debated, but the plant is native to South America so it appears to have reached Lake Victoria due to human activity. As its flowers are reputed for their beauty, it might have been brought over as an ornamental for garden ponds by Belgian colonists in Rwanda and Burundi. The consensus is that water hyacinth entered Lake Victoria from Rwanda via the river Kagera, probably in the 1980s. The hyacinth has since spread prolifically, due to a lack of natural predators, an abundance of space, agreeable temperature conditions, and abundant nutrients, including increasing heavy metal pollution in the lake.

Water hyacinths increased rapidly between 1992–1998, were greatly reduced by 2001, and have since resurged to a lesser degree. Management techniques include (hyacinth-eating) insect controls and manual beach cleanup efforts.  A water hyacinth infestation is seldom totally eradicated. Instead, it is a situation that must be continually managed.

Development 
Water hyacinth affects the Lake Victorian population in many negative ways.  There are economic impacts when the weed blocks boat access.  The effects on transportation and fishing are immediately felt.  Where the weed is prolific, there is a general increase in several diseases, as the weed creates excellent breeding areas for mosquitoes and other insects.  There are increased incidents of skin rash, cough, malaria, encephalitis, gastro-intestinal disorders, and bilharzia/schistosomiasis.  Water hyacinth also interferes with water treatment, irrigation, and water supply.  It can smother aquatic life by deoxygenating the water, and it reduces nutrients for young fish in sheltered bays.  It has blocked supply intakes for the hydroelectric plant, interrupting electrical power for entire cities.  The weed also interrupts local subsistence fishing, blocking access to the beaches.

There are also indications that water hyacinths can provide benefits to the Lake Victoria Region. Water hyacinths have been planted in an attempt to purify eutrophicated water. Once established, the plants can be harvested and used for biogas production, fertilizer, and other things. In 2018 two biogas digesters were installed in the village of Dunga in Kenya, with many more slated to be installed in Kenya.

References 

Environment of Africa
Lake Victoria
Pontederiaceae
Invasive plant species by region